Central High School is a public high school in San Angelo, Texas. It is part of the San Angelo Independent School District. The school serves grades 10–12, with a secondary campus for 9th grade. The secondary campus was incorporated as one school two campuses 2020-2021 school year. Its mascot is the Bobcat. The school serves much of San Angelo and the unincorporated community of Tankersley.

Athletics
With a reported enrollment of 2,993 (which combines the freshman campus and high school enrollments), the Bobcats of San Angelo Central compete with some of Texas' largest high schools as a member of Conference 6A of the University Interscholastic League, the state's governing body for public-school competition.

Soccer
The men's soccer team won the regional soccer tournament and went on to the state tournament in 2001. The Lady Cat Soccer team made the playoffs each year from 2002 to 2005 and reached the round of 16 in 2002. The Lady Cat soccer team, led by head coach Ben Henry, also made the playoffs four years running from 2008 to 2011, three times being knocked out in the bidistrict round (2009, 2010, 2011) and once in the area championship game (2008).

Gymnastics
The Lady Cats gymnastics team won back-to-back state championships four years. Members from both the women's and men's teams were selected for the Texas National Team, with the women (led by Central coach Tony Walker) winning the national championship. The Bobcats won the Texas State Championship in 1974, 1976, 1978, 1983, 1987, 2001, and 2015. The Lady Cats won the Texas State Championship in 1989, 2006, 2007, 2008, 2009, 2013, 2014, 2015 and 2019.

Tennis
The Bobcats' tennis team finished the 2009 season ranked 15th by the Texas Tennis Coaches Association.

Volleyball
The Lady Cats volleyball team finished its 2007 season ranked 22nd by the Texas Girls Coaches Association. After 22 years of coaching, Central High School girls volleyball coach Connie Bozarth reached a milestone 500 wins on September 16, 2008. Central's overall record is 32-10 (13-5 for 2008 season) and has been a regional qualifier for past three years.

Cheerleading
The Central High School cheerleaders were crowned national champions at the 2008–2009, 2010, and 2011National Association of Cheerleaders Nationals competition. The cheerleaders are coached by Central High School math teacher, and former Bobcat gymnast, Matt Escue (teacher of the year).

Baseball
The baseball program at Central won the district title in 2017 (1st in over 30 years). The first district championship was won in 1976 coached by Harvey Reeves.

Football
Central High School Bobcats football had its heyday from the 1940s through the 1970s under head coaches Jewell Wallace, Bob Harrell, Emory Bellard, Dan Lagrasta, and Smitty Hill, winning state championships in 1943 (open class) and 1966 (Conference 4A, the largest classification at the time). Traditionally, Central competed with Odessa High, Odessa Permian, Midland High, Midland Lee, Abilene, and Abilene Cooper in UIL District 3-5A (District 3-4A until 1979), a grouping popularly known as the 'Little Southwest Conference' due to the extremely high standard of football exhibited by the district's schools. After the 1997 season, the Bobcats were moved away from the LSC into District 2-5A with teams from Lubbock and Amarillo.

Beginning with the 2008–2009 academic year, the Bobcats, along with five of its newer Panhandle rivals, were to rejoin the four Odessa and Midland schools in an enlarged 10-team District 2-5A. Central's first season in the new district garnered them an 0–10 record for the season. On January 20, 2009, SAISD formally approved Brent Davis, from Alice in South Texas, as the new head football coach. Davis' offensive and defensive coordinators from Alice were expected to be hired as Central assistant coaches. Davis finished his first season with a 2–8 record, obtaining the two wins in the last two weeks of the season against Lubbock Coronado and Amarillo Tascosa. The two wins ended a 21-game losing streak that extended into the end of the 2007 season. The Bobcats, in 2010, reached the playoffs. They entered with a 4–6 record, winning their first game against El Paso Franklin before falling at home to Martin High School. In 2011, the Bobcats won their first undisputed district title for the first time since 1963. They finished the regular season with a record of 8–2.

Coaching history

*record only 1951 and '52.Source:

Fine arts

Theatre
The Central High School theatre department presents two mainstages a year and a presentation of their UIL One Act Competition piece in the late spring.

The students involved in the department attend a yearly state thespian festival where the department had earned many honors such as "All-Star Troupe" and has had students compete at the international level in Monologues, Solo Musical, and Theatrical Marketing.

Notable alumni
 Davis Martin is a professional baseball pitcher for the Chicago White Sox, and played for the Texas Tech Red Raiders baseball team from 2015-2018.
 Kristopher Carter, composer, won an Emmy award for his work on the animated series Batman Beyond.
 August Pfluger is the U.S. representative for Texas's 11th congressional district (2021–)
 David Hulse played for the Texas Rangers and Milwaukee Brewers from 1992 to 1996.
 Trey Lunsford, catcher for the San Francisco Giants, played five total games from 2002 to 2003.
 Marc Menchaca, actor, appeared in Ozark and The Outsider.
 Shea Morenz was a quarterback for the Texas Longhorns.
 Fess Parker, actor, portrayed Davy Crockett and Daniel Boone in the respective TV shows.
 Lucy A. Snyder is a science-fiction author.

References

External links

 
 Official website of Central High School Choir
 Oxford Opportunity for Cayddrick Ballard
 Official website for Central High School Texas 936 unit

Buildings and structures in San Angelo, Texas
Schools in Tom Green County, Texas
Public high schools in Texas
San Angelo Independent School District